Manik Kamini Kadam (1933 – 2000), popularly known as Kamini Kadam, is an Indian actress who acted in several  Marathi, Kannada and Hindi films in the 1950s and 1960s.

Biography
She made her debut in Marathi films under the screen name of Smita in 1955 in Yere Maazya Magalya. She acted in a number of Marathi films before switching over to Hindi films. In 1958, Kadam changed her screen name to Kamini Kadam and made her debut in Hindi films with Talaq (1958) opposite Rajendra Kumar. Other notable Hindi films to her credit include Santan (1959), School Master (1959) and Sapne Suhane (1961). Kamini Kadam died on 29 June 2000 at the age of 66.

Filmography
Hindi Films:
 Talaq – 1958 
 Santan – 1959 
 School Master – 1959 
 Maa Baap – 1960 
 Miya Bibi Razi – 1960 
 Sapne Suhane – 1961

Marathi Films:
 Yere Maazya Magalya – 1955
 Sudharlelya Bayka - 1965
and many more

Kannada Films:
 Kranthiveera Sangolli Rayanna - 1967

References

External links
Kamini Kadam biography on cineplot

1933 births
2000 deaths
Indian film actresses
Marathi actors
Actresses from Mumbai
20th-century Indian actresses
Actresses in Marathi cinema
Actresses in Hindi cinema